The Transportation of Dangerous Goods Act, 1992 is a Canadian law that regulates the transportation of dangerous goods in the country. The introduction defines it as An Act to promote public safety in the transportation of dangerous goods.

References

Canadian transport law
1992 in Canadian law
Canadian federal legislation
History of transport in Canada
1992 in transport